Clement Bengough (14 January 1861 – 19 November 1934) was an English cricketer. He played two matches for Gloucestershire in 1880.

References

1861 births
1934 deaths
English cricketers
Gloucestershire cricketers
Cricketers from Bristol